St John the Divine's Church is in Church Street, Lamberhead Green, Pemberton, Wigan, Greater Manchester, England. It is an active Anglican parish church in the deanery of Wigan, the archdeaconry of Warrington, and the diocese of Liverpool. The church is recorded in the National Heritage List for England as a designated Grade II listed building. It was a Commissioners' church, having received a grant towards its construction from the Church Building Commission.

History

The church was built between 1830 and 1832 to a design by Thomas Rickman and Henry Hutchinson. A grant of £4,913 was given towards its construction by the Church Building Commission. It was consecrated on 26 September 1832, and was originally a chapel of ease to Wigan Parish Church. Between 2008 and 2011 the church was modernised with the creation of a kitchen, toilets and a meeting area at the west end.

Architecture

St John's is constructed in brick with sandstone dressings, and has slate roofs. Its architectural style is Gothic Revival. The plan consists of a nine-bay nave, north and south aisles, north and south porches, and a short single-bay chancel. At the west end are corner pilasters, each containing a blind lancet window, rising to a turret containing a louvred lancet, and with an embattled parapet. In the centre of the west front is a gabled doorway flanked by buttresses, the gable of the doorway containing a shield. Above it is a triple stepped lancet window, and over this is a blind lancet. Each bay along the sides of the aisles contains a lancet window. The east window consists of a stepped triple lancet. Inside the church are three galleries carried on cast iron columns. The ceiling is flat.

External features

The boundary walls and gates to the west and south of the churchyard are also listed at Grade II. The walls and gate piers are in sandstone, and the elaborate gates are in wrought iron. The churchyard contains 25 war graves of Commonwealth service personnel, 14 of World War I and 11 of World War II.

See also

List of churches in Greater Manchester
List of Commissioners' churches in Northeast and Northwest England
List of new churches by Thomas Rickman
Listed buildings in Wigan

References

External links
Lancashire OnLine Clerks, with photographs of the exterior

Church of England church buildings in Greater Manchester
Anglican Diocese of Liverpool
Gothic Revival church buildings in Greater Manchester
Pemberton
Churches completed in 1832
19th-century Church of England church buildings
Thomas Rickman buildings
Commissioners' church buildings